Parque Municipal dos Desportos de Fafe is a multi-use stadium in Fafe, Portugal.  It is currently used mostly for football matches and is the home stadium of AD Fafe. The stadium is able to hold 8,000 people.  It was built  in 1968 and it is used by AD Fafe which currently plays in the Portuguese Third Division.

References

Football venues in Portugal
Sports venues in Braga District
Sport in Fafe
Buildings and structures in Fafe
Sports venues completed in 1968